Sex, Lies & Obsession is a 2001 American made-for-television drama film directed by Douglas Barr and starring Harry Hamlin and Lisa Rinna as a couple whose marriage is at stake due to sexual addiction.

Plot 
Joanna Thomas, a high school drama teacher, has been happily married for 15 years to Cameron Thomas, a successful orthopedic surgeon. Joanna's life seems complete until she begins to suspect that Cameron is having an affair. Her worst fears are confirmed when her intuition leads her to follow him one morning, ending up at an apartment complex. In horrified disbelief, Joanna watches Cameron embrace another woman. After Joanna tells her husband to leave their home, a distraught Cameron heads straight to the red light district to pick up a prostitute. Weeks later, Joanna allows Cameron to move back into the house, although she's still suspicious of his every move.

Things seem to return to normal until one night she gets a call from Cameron, who has been arrested for soliciting a prostitute. An enraged Joanna breaks open Cameron's locked desk drawer and discovers a key to the apartment where she had followed him earlier. There, she finds stacks of porn magazines, drawers full of condoms, oils, and X-rated videos—Cameron's very own den of iniquity. Joanna learns that Cameron's double life included frequenting prostitutes for years, visits to strip clubs and frequent phone sex.

In order to avoid an embarrassing court appearance, Cameron is ordered to see a psychologist, who requests that Joanna also attend. Joanna and Cameron learn that he may be a sex addict. Cameron reacts to the news by storming out of the office, and going to the one place where he finds solace, a strip club. He begins to observe the behavior of several men at the club, and eventually finds himself in a porn shop feeding quarters into a peep show. Desperate and overwrought, Cameron runs home to Joanna and admits he has a problem, begging for help. Cameron continues his therapy sessions with the psychologist and begins attending Sex Addicts Anonymous meetings. Feeling like his life is back on track, Cameron approaches Joanna about moving back in, but Joanna isn't ready, and they quarrel. An angry Cameron heads straight for the red-light district to cruise for prostitutes. Only this time something stops him. He phones the one person who can help him, his sponsor Carl. Three months later, Cameron stands before his group of fellow Sex Addicts to receive his 90-day medallion for abstaining. Joanna arrives at the meeting, but time will tell if she can forgive Cameron's betrayal, if Cameron can live a life free from sexual addiction and if together they can rebuild the life they once knew.

Cast
Harry Hamlin as Cameron Thomas
Lisa Rinna as Joanna Thomas
Kevin Zegers as Josh Thomas
Robert Clark as Ryan Thomas
Rebecca Jenkins as Annika
Karl Pruner as Douglas Weiss
Anna Ferguson as Eleanor
Geoffrey Bowes	as Carl
Makyla Smith as Juliet
Yani Gellman as Romeo
Carolyn Dunn as Tiffany Sheldon
Elizabeth Walsh as Sarah

Production
The film was shot in Toronto between January 29 and February 21, 2001.

On working together with his wife Lisa Rinna, Harry Hamlin commented: "It brought up a lot of interesting things for us because it dealt with classic issues that would come up in any marriage, such as sexual infidelity, lies and deception — all those things that are antithetical to what a marriage is really supposed to be about. [..] This was pretty intense stuff — we knew that going in. We knew that we were going to be dealing with some issues that married couples would rather not deal with. If we are going to do something else, I'd rather it be lighter."

Announced Remake 
On July 9, 2021, Deadline announced that Lionsgate, who owns the library of Hearst Entertainment, the film's co-production partner (and filmed entertainment division of Lifetime co-owner Hearst Communications), will partner with MarVista Entertainment in remaking certain selections in the Hearst library. Some of the films on tap for the remake spree included this film, alongside films like The Babysitter's Seduction, Sex & Mrs. X, Blue Valley Songbird, Santa Who?, A Different Kind of Christmas, and a possibility of over 100 other titles in the library. No further details have been released, including a date for when these films should be released, though Lionsgate and MarVista, who will jointly distribute these films, have planned to release these films to an undetermined streaming service.

References

External links

2001 television films
2001 films
Films about sex addiction
Films set in New York City
Films set in San Francisco
Films shot in Vancouver
Lifetime (TV network) films
American drama television films
2000s English-language films
Films directed by Douglas Barr
2000s American films